Iglesias may refer to:
 Iglesias, Sardinia, a town in a comune in the province of South Sardinia, region of Sardinia, Italy
 Iglesias, Province of Burgos, a municipality in the province of Burgos, in the autonomous community of Castile and León, Spain
 Province of Carbonia-Iglesias an ex province in the region of Sardinia, Italy
 Iglesias (surname)